Jaye may refer to:

First name
Jaye Andrews (born 1960s), American professional basketball player
Jaye Davidson (born 1968), American-born British model and actor
Jaye Edwards (1918–2022), British aviator
Jaye Griffiths (born 1963), British actress
Jaye Jacobs (born 1982), English actress
Jaye Luckett (currently known as Jammes Luckett; born 1974), American musician, writer, visual artist, and voice actor
Jaye P. Morgan (born 1931), American singer, actress, and gameshow panelist
Jaye Radisich (1976–2012), Australian politician
Jaye Walton (1928–2017), Australian media personality

Surname
Myles Jaye (born 1991), American baseball player
Cassie Jaye (born 1986), American actress and film director
Courtney Jaye (born 1978), American Indie music singer/songwriter
David Jaye (born 1958), American politician
Jerry Jaye (born 1937), American country/rockabilly singer
Sally Jaye (born ?), American folk singer/songwriter

See also
Jay (given name)
Jay (surname)